Robert Flack may refer to:

Robert Flack (South African cricketer) (1917–1993), South African cricketer who played for Eastern Province
Robert Flack (English cricketer) (born 1943), English cricketer who played for Suffolk

See also
 Roberta Flack (born 1937), American singer